The 1999 WTA Madrid Open singles was the singles event of the fourth edition of the Madrid Open, a WTA Tier III tournament held in Madrid, Spain and part of the European clay court season. Patty Schnyder was the defending champion but she was defeated in the second round by Paola Suárez.

First seed Lindsay Davenport won the title, defeating Suárez in the final.

Seeds
The top two seeds received a bye to the second round.

  Lindsay Davenport (champion)
  Patty Schnyder (second round)
 n.a.
  Chanda Rubin (semifinals)
  Silvia Farina (quarterfinals)
  Magüi Serna (quarterfinals)
  Amy Frazier (semifinals)
  Virginia Ruano Pascual (first round)
  Anna Smashnova (quarterfinals)

Draw

Finals

Top half

Bottom half

Qualifying

Seeds

  Emmanuelle Gagliardi (qualifier)
  Nicole Pratt (qualifier)
  Mariana Díaz Oliva (first round)
 n.a.
  Adriana Serra Zanetti (first round)
  Paola Suárez (qualifying competition, lucky loser)
  Conchita Martínez Granados (second round, retired)
  Raluca Sandu (qualifier)
  Gisela Riera (qualifier)

Qualifiers

  Emmanuelle Gagliardi
  Gisela Riera
  Raluca Sandu
  Nicole Pratt

Lucky losers

  Paola Suárez
  Rosa María Andrés Rodríguez

Qualifying draw

First qualifier

Second qualifier

Third qualifier

Fourth qualifier

External links
 WTA Madrid Open Singles draw

Singles